Central Arkansas is a metropolitan statistical area of the U.S. state of Arkansas.

Central Arkansas may also refer to:
University of Central Arkansas, a public university in Conway, Arkansas, United States
Central Arkansas Bears and Sugar Bears, that university's athletics program
Central Arkansas Library System, a public library system headquartered in Little Rock, Arkansas, United States
Central Arkansas Christian Schools, a group of private schools based in North Little Rock, Arkansas, United States